Itasca Township may refer to the following townships in the United States:

 Itasca Township, Clearwater County, Minnesota
 Itasca Township, Sherman County, Kansas